The Sun is a band with styles described as garage, indie, progressive and psychedelic.

History
The Sun released their first full-length album Blame It on the Youth June 7, 2005 on DVD. Every song has a music video. The disc also has WAV files on it for listening without viewing the videos. While it claims to be the first DVD album, it is not a new idea. There were a few albums in the 1980s that had a video cassette release in the same vein.

The band gained Internet exposure through their music video for the song "Romantic Death", which featured footage (from Beautiful Agony) of people's faces during orgasm.

Band members
 Chris Burney (vocals, guitar)
 Sam Brown (drums)
 Bryan Arendt (guitar)
 Brad Forsblom (bass, backing vocals)
 Brad Caulkins (keyboard, guitar, backing vocals)

External links

"Romantic Death" music video on iFilm

Indie rock musical groups from Ohio
Musical groups from Columbus, Ohio